Świerszczewo may refer to:

Świerszczewo, Kołobrzeg County
Świerszczewo, Szczecinek County

See also
Świerczów (disambiguation)
Świerszczów (disambiguation)